The Montana Group is a geologic group in South Dakota. It preserves fossils dating back to the Cretaceous period.

See also

 List of fossiliferous stratigraphic units in South Dakota
 Paleontology in South Dakota

References
 

Geologic groups of South Dakota
Cretaceous System of North America